Reflections in Black ( / Vice Wears Black Hose) is a 1975 Italian giallo film directed by the actor Tano Cimarosa, here at his directorial debut.

Plot 
In San Benedetto del Tronto a mysterious murderess kills young and beautiful women. The murderess, as glimpsed from some eyewitnesses, has the look of a young woman dressed in black.

Cast 

John Richardson as Inspector Lavina 
Magda Konopka as  Countess Orselmo 
Dagmar Lassander as  Leonora Anselmi 
Ninetto Davoli as  Marco 
Giacomo Rossi Stuart as  Mr. Anselmi 
Dada Gallotti as  Valeria
Daniela Giordano as  Concetta 
Ursula Davis as Anna
Tano Cimarosa as Sergeant Pantò

References

External links

1970s Italian-language films
Giallo films
1970s crime thriller films
1975 directorial debut films
1975 films
Films set in Italy
Films scored by Carlo Savina
1970s Italian films